Issa Shanan Alharrasi (born 19 August 1999) is a Qatari tennis player.

Alharrasi has a career high ATP doubles ranking of 1829 achieved on 25 October 2021.

Alharrasi made his ATP main draw debut at the 2022 Qatar ExxonMobil Open after receiving a wildcard into the doubles main draw with Illya Marchenko. He also represents Qatar at the Davis Cup, where he has a W/L record of 1–2.

References

External links

1999 births
Living people
Qatari male tennis players